Smart Work is a 1931 American comedy film directed by Fatty Arbuckle and starring Billy Dooley and Addie McPhail.

Cast
 Billy Dooley
 Addie McPhail

See also
 Fatty Arbuckle filmography

External links

1931 films
1931 comedy films
1931 short films
Films directed by Roscoe Arbuckle
Educational Pictures short films
American black-and-white films
American comedy short films
Films with screenplays by Jack Townley
1930s English-language films
1930s American films